Brice Achkir from the Cisco Systems, Inc., San Jose, CA was named Fellow of the Institute of Electrical and Electronics Engineers (IEEE) in 2014 for contributions to diagnostics of physical layer design in gigabit digital transmission systems.

References

Living people
Fellow Members of the IEEE
Year of birth missing (living people)
Place of birth missing (living people)
American electrical engineers